Coyote Dry Lake is a dry lake bed  in the Mojave Desert of San Bernardino County, California,  northeast of Barstow.

Coyote Dry Lake lies to the south of Fort Irwin Military Reservation and southwest of the Tiefort Mountains.

Numerous meteorites have been found on the lake bed.

In media

In 1975, the cult classic science fiction film A Boy and His Dog was made near this lake.
In 2000, the Chilean rock band La Ley shot the music video for the hit single "Aquí", which is included in their album Uno. The album's cover art features the band members at the location.
It is believed that in 2006, Daft Punk shot scenes at this location for their 2006 Movie, “Electroma”
 In 2016, the a cappella group Pentatonix shot the music video for their cover of "Hallelujah", originally performed by Leonard Cohen.
 In 2017, reggaetón performer Yandel shot the music video for his single "Mi Religión" at the location.
 In 2020, global pop group Now United shot their music video for their single "Come Together" at the location.
 In 2020, Texas rock & roller Koe Wetzel shot the music video for the single "Cold & Alone" at the location.

See also
List of lakes in California

Notes

References

External links
 
 Satellite Photo (Google Maps)

Lakes of the Mojave Desert
Endorheic lakes of California
Salt flats of California
Lakes of San Bernardino County, California
Natural history of the Mojave Desert
Lakes of California
Landforms of San Bernardino County, California
Lakes of Southern California